The House on Haunted Hill is the ninth episode of the 1969 ITC British television series Randall and Hopkirk (Deceased) starring Mike Pratt, Kenneth Cope and Judith Arthy. The episode was first broadcast on 16 November 1969 on ITV, and was directed by Ray Austin.

Synopsis
Jeff is assigned two cases at once. He sends Marty to investigate the first, a supposedly-haunted mansion, Merston Manor, for a Mr. Webster. He takes the second, a diamond theft from Mortland, himself. The sales director of Mortland, Mr. Previss, threatens Jeff, then offers him £5000 to close the case. Jeff attempts to expose Previss, but Previss reveals he has kidnapped Jeannie's sister Jenny to make sure he cooperates.

Webster contacts Jeff to ask why Jeff's car, which Jenny was using, is parked outside the Manor. Jeff realizes that Jenny has been taken there, and joins Marty to investigate. They find out that the house is a front for a diamond-fencing organization. The criminals attack and restrain Jeff with Jenny. Marty finds a psychic group meeting close by and manages to ask for help through one of the members, who attend the manor and rescue Jeff.

Cast
Mike Pratt as Jeff Randall
Kenneth Cope as Marty Hopkirk
Judith Arthy as Jenny
Keith Buckley as Lattimer
Jeremy Burnham as Walter Previss
George A. Cooper as Webster
Terry Duggan as Jackson
Peter Jones as Frederick P. Waller
Dermot Kelly as Henry Mace Horsfall
William Kendall as Col. Jarrett
John Kidd as Simpson
Duncan Lamont as Langford
Garfield Morgan as Carlson
David Sinclair as Smith

Characters
Annette Andre does not appear in this episode, as she was ill at the time of recording. Her character Jeannie Hopkirk is explained away as being on holiday, and Jenny (Judith Arthy), Jeannie's sister, who first appeared in "A Disturbing Case", is standing in for Jeannie as Jeff Randall's secretary.

Moreover, following the episode's prologue, Judith Arthy is named in the title sequence in place of Annette Andre, although no image of Arthy is used. This is the only episode in the entire series where the title sequence is different.

Video and DVD release
The episode was released on VHS and several times on DVD with differing special features.

External links

Randall and Hopkirk (Deceased) episodes
1969 British television episodes